Robert Lofton Brown (January 30, 1950 – December 8, 2011) was a Democratic member of the Georgia (US) State Senate, representing the 26th District. He was first elected in an August 1991 special election and held office until June 2011. He was elected by his fellow Democrats as minority leader in 2004 and held that position until he resigned to run for mayor of Macon, Georgia.

Death
On December 8, 2011, Brown's body was found in his Macon home. The local coroner revealed that he died from what appeared to be a self-inflicted gunshot wound to his head.

References

External links

Follow the Money - Robert Brown
2006 2004 2002 2000 1998 1996 1994 1992 campaign contributions

1950 births
2011 deaths
African-American state legislators in Georgia (U.S. state)
American politicians who committed suicide
Democratic Party Georgia (U.S. state) state senators
People from Greenville, Georgia
People from Macon, Georgia
Suicides by firearm in Georgia (U.S. state)
21st-century American politicians
21st-century African-American politicians
20th-century African-American people